The 2021 IFSC Climbing World Championships was the 17th edition of the event. It was held in Moscow, Russia from 16 to 21 September 2021, alongside the 2021 IFSC Paraclimbing World Championships.

Although the World Anti-Doping Agency (WADA) had banned Russia from hosting or bidding for a world championship event in any sport until December 2022 due to several doping violations, the IFSC announced in February 2021 that the event would remain in Russia, echoing the Court of Arbitration for Sport's ruling that events had to be reassigned "unless it is legally or practically impossible to do so."

Two venues were used during the championships: the Irina Viner-Usmanova Gymnastics Palace and the CSKA Universal Sports Hall.

Medalists

Medal table

Broadcast incident
On 18 September, the IFSC issued an apology after broadcasters showed a close-up of chalk handprints on Austrian climber Joanna Färber's bottom during the women's bouldering semi-finals in the event live feed. The federation removed the feed from its YouTube channel and re-uploaded an edited video without the footage it described as "objectification of the human body." This incident marked the second time in the season that the IFSC apologised for sexualised imagery, after a similar footage of Färber appeared on the live feed of the Innsbruck World Cup in June 2021.

Schedule
All times and dates use Moscow Time (UTC+3:00)

Lead

Men

Women

Bouldering

Men

Women

Speed

Men
Final bracket

Women
Final bracket

Combined

Men

Women

Notes

See also
 2021 IFSC Paraclimbing World Championships
 2021 IFSC Climbing World Cup
 Sport climbing at the 2020 Summer Olympics

External links

References

IFSC Climbing World Championships
World Climbing Championships
IFSC
International sports competitions hosted by Russia
Sports competitions in Moscow
IFSC